Robert Betts Laughlin (born November 1, 1950) is the Anne T. and Robert M. Bass Professor of Physics and Applied Physics at Stanford University. Along with Horst L. Störmer of Columbia University and Daniel C. Tsui of Princeton University, he was awarded a share of the 1998 Nobel Prize in physics for their explanation of the fractional quantum Hall effect.

In 1983, Laughlin was first to provide a many body wave function, now known as the Laughlin wavefunction, for the fractional quantum hall effect, which was able to correctly explain the fractionalized charge observed in experiments. This state has since been interpreted as the integer quantum Hall effect of the composite fermion.

His 2017 paper, "Pumped thermal grid storage with heat exchange" inspired Project Malta at Google X and subsequently Malta inc.

Biography
Laughlin was born in Visalia, California. He earned a B.A. in mathematics at the University of California, Berkeley in 1972, and his Ph.D. in physics in 1979 at the Massachusetts Institute of Technology (MIT). Between 2004 and 2006   he served as the president of KAIST in Daejeon, South Korea.

Honors and awards 
 E. O. Lawrence Award in Physics – 1984
 Oliver E. Buckley Prize – 1986
 Elected Fellow of the American Physical Society - 1986
 National Academy of Sciences – 1994
 Benjamin Franklin Medal for Physics of the Franklin Institute – 1998
 Nobel Prize in Physics – 1998
 Golden Plate Award of the American Academy of Achievement – 1999
 Doctorate of Letters, University of Maryland – 2005
 Onsager Medal – 2007

Publications 

Laughlin published a book entitled A Different Universe: Reinventing Physics from the Bottom Down in 2005. The book argues for emergence as a replacement for reductionism, in addition to general commentary on hot-topic issues.
  (Trad. esp.: Un universo diferente. La reinvención de la física en la Edad de la Emergencia, Buenos Aires/Madrid, Katz editores, 2007).
  (Trad. esp.: Crímenes de la razón. El fin de la mentalidad científica, Buenos Aires/Madrid, Katz editores, 2010). 
 Mente y materia. ¿Qué es la vida? Sobre la vigencia de Erwin Schrödinger (with Michael R. Hendrickson; Robert Pogue Harrison and Hans Ulrich Gumbrecht), Buenos Aires/Madrid, Katz editores, 2010, .

References

External links 

  including the Nobel Lecture on December 8, 1998 Fractional Quantization
 The Crime of Reason and the Closing of the Scientific Mind lecture at the Linda Hall Library, May 4, 2011
 

Nobel laureates in Physics
American Nobel laureates
1950 births
Living people
University of California, Berkeley alumni
Scientists at Bell Labs
People from Visalia, California
Members of the United States National Academy of Sciences
Stanford University Department of Applied Physics faculty
Stanford University Department of Physics faculty
Oliver E. Buckley Condensed Matter Prize winners
MIT Department of Physics alumni
Fellows of the American Physical Society
Presidents of KAIST